Matthew Sleeth (born 1972) is an Australian visual artist and filmmaker. His often collaborative practice incorporates photography, film, sculpture and installation with a particular focus on the aesthetic and conceptual concerns of new media. The performative and photographic nature of media art is regularly highlighted in his work.

Early life
Sleeth was born in 1972 in Melbourne.

Career
Matthew Sleeth's early career is defined through three photographic monographs. Roaring Days, is the only one showing his work with black & white photography, played with nostalgia and politics. The Bank Book is a response to the making of a feature film. Tour of Duty, explores the performance/performative aspect of armed conflict as seen during the 1999 East Timorese crisis.

In 2001, he was named one of the 30 most influential artists under 30 in PDN Magazine.

In 2005/6 Sleeth lived in Tokyo as part of the Australia Council’s studio residency program. Then, in 2007, he was featured on the cover of Australian Art Collector magazine.

Following the publication of Opfikon in 2004, Sleeth's practice became more conceptually driven. His work expanded from photography and video to include sculpture, print-making and installation. Pattern Recognition, an exhibition of public billboards for the 2008 Melbourne International Arts Festival, was described as exploring "ideas about photography itself and the way it has historically been used to order and categorise life". The Aperture Foundation's Exposures Blog described his New York solo exhibition, Various Positions (parts 1 through 6), as "working toward a new photographic aesthetic". It opened at Claire Oliver Gallery in Chelsea, Manhattan on 18 March 2009.

Sleeth has consistently embraced new technologies and methods of production, working with 3D printing, aerial drones, electronics and computer programming.

His work with 3D printing and CNC fabrication led to Sleeth's sculptural installation, The Rise and Fall of Western Civilization (And Other Obvious Metaphors). This concrete freeway combined photography, metal, plywood and micro-computers with LED displays.

As his film practice evolved, Sleeth's interest in performance became more apparent, particularly in video works such as I Don't See God Up Here and Kerobokan Portraits [Andrew and Myuran].

In 2015 Sleeth co-wrote and directed A Drone Opera. Presented by Arts House and Experimenta, the live performance combined opera singers, laser set-design and purpose-built drones to bring together the sense of surveillance and menace that explores our relationship with new technologies. In June 2019, a cinematic version of A Drone Opera was screened at the Sydney Film Festival and a three-channel film installation was presented at Carriageworks, Sydney.

Sleeth's work with Myuran Sukumaran at Kerobokan Prison and the campaign to save Sukumaran and Andrew Chan from execution, fuelled the development of 2017's Guilty. In his feature film debut, Sleeth highlighted the final 72 hours of Sukumaran's life and questions the use of execution as a means of punishment. Guilty premiered at the Adelaide Film Festival on 8 October 2017 and was released by Madman Entertainment on DVD in April 2020.

Filmography

Films

Short films

Film festivals
 Guilty, Adelaide Film Festival, premiere, 2017
 Guilty, Human Rights Film Festival, 2018
 Guilty, Dili International Film Festival, 2018
 A Drone Opera, Sydney Film Festival, premiere, 2019

Live performance
 A Drone Opera (Director, Writer, Performer) - commissioned by Experimenta Media Arts and presented by Arts House at Meat Market, Melbourne, September 2015.
 Prize Fighter (Performer) - presented by La Boite Theatre and Melbourne International Arts Festival, October 2018.

Monographs
 Roaring Days  (M.33, Melbourne, 1998)
 Tour of Duty  (Hardie Grant Books, Melbourne, 2002)
 home + away  (M.33, Melbourne, 2003)
 Survey (Josef Lebovic Gallery, Sydney, 2004)
 Opfikon  (M.33, Melbourne, 2004)
 Ten Series/106 Photographs  (Aperture Foundation, New York, 2007)

Collections
Sleeth's work is held in the following public collections:

 Artbank
 Australia Council for the Arts
 Australian War Memorial
 Brandts Museet for Fotokunst
 Campbelltown Arts Centre
 La Trobe University Art Museum
 Monash Gallery of Art
 Monash University Museum of Art
 Museum of Photographic Arts
 Lyon Housemuseum
 National Gallery of Australia
 National Gallery of Victoria
 National Portrait Gallery (Australia)
 Town Hall Gallery

Solo exhibitions

 Short Stories, Centre for Contemporary Photography, Melbourne 1996
 Boys, Prostitutes Collective of Victoria, Melbourne 1997
 Silvers Circus, Leica Gallery, Solms, Germany 1998
 Roaring Days, Stills Gallery, Sydney 1998
 Roaring Days, Photographers’ Gallery, Melbourne 1998
 Roaring Days, Saba Gallery, New York 2000
 Tour of Duty, Boccalero Gallery, Los Angeles 2001
 Roaring Days, Leica Gallery, Tokyo 2001
 Tour Of Duty, Centre for Contemporary Photography, Melbourne 2002
 Feet, Citylights, Melbourne 2003
 Survey, Josef Lebovic Gallery at The Depot, Sydney 2004
 Tour Of Duty, Galerie Lichtblick, Cologne 2004
 Red China, Centre for Contemporary Photography, Melbourne 2005
 Rosebud, Fremantle Prison, Fotofreo Festival, Fremantle, Western Australia 2006
 Pictured, Monash Gallery of Art, Melbourne 2006
 Call Of The Wild, Fyrtøjet, Odense Photo Triennial, Denmark. 2006
 12 Views of Mount Fuji, Jan Manton Art, Brisbane 2007
 Mixed Tape, Sophie Gannon Gallery, Melbourne 2007
 Ten Series, Australian Centre for Photography, Sydney 2007
 Ten Series, Aperture Gallery, New York 2008
 Matthew Sleeth, Claire Oliver Gallery, Next 08 @ Art Chicago, USA 2008
 Pattern Recognition, Sophie Gannon Gallery & multiple site specific public installations Melbourne International Arts Festival, Melbourne 2008
 Various Positions Parts 1-6, Claire Oliver Gallery, New York 2009
 The Rise and Fall of Western Civilization (And Other Obvious Metaphors), Claire Oliver Gallery, New York 2011
 The Generative Freeway Project, Tin Sheds Gallery, Sydney, (ISEA) 2013
 The Last Carpark, WestSpace, Melbourne (Liquid Architecture Festival of Sound Art) 2013
 Representation and Reproduction: a love story, Royal Melbourne Institute of Technology, 2014
 Intentionally Left Blank, Trocadero Art Space, Melbourne 2014
 Magnificent Obsessions, Claire Oliver Gallery, New York 2015
 Rules to Live By, Claire Oliver Gallery, New York 2016
 The End, Gertrude Contemporary, Melbourne 2017
 It Was All A Dream, Pulse, Miami 2017
 Rosebud, Town Hall Gallery, Melbourne 2018
 A Drone Opera, Carriageworks, Sydney 2019
 A Drone Opera, Lyon Housemuseum, Melbourne 2020
 A Drone Opera, Ars Electronica, Austria 2020

References

External links
 Matthew Sleeth represented by Claire Oliver
 National Gallery of Victoria website
 Matthew Sleeth website

1972 births
Australian photographers
Living people
Australian contemporary artists